Oruvan is a 2006 Indian Malayalam-language film directed by Vinu Anand. The film stars Indrajith Sukumaran and Lal.

Cast

 Indrajith Sukumaran as Shivan
 Lal as Bharathan	
 Meera Vasudev as Jaya
 Subair as Psychiatrist
 Anoop Chandran as Ravi
 Mala Aravindan as Velayudhan	
 Salim Kumar as Balan
V. K. Sreeraman as Marakkar
Shamna Kasim as Devutty
T. G. Ravi as Vilaganoor Ashan	
Gayathri as Jaanu
Sreehari as Chandran
Unnimaya as Meenukutty
Shaalin Zoya as Remya Mol
Anand as CI Madhavan
Souparnika Subhash as Geethu
Balu Varghese as Young Shivan
 Prithviraj Sukumaran as SI Jeevan (cameo appearance)
Sreejith Ravi- Cameo Appearance
Tosh Christy - Cameo Appearance
Sajeed Puthalath - Cameo Appearance 
Geetha Salam
Ambika Mohan

Production 
The film was shot in Palghat. Prithviraj Sukumaran shot a cameo in the film.

Reception
A critic from Nowrunning wrote that "director Vinu Anand and his team must be appreciated for having ventured to make a rather different kind of a movie with a very striking end, and that too in a fairly good manner for a maiden venture". Indiaglitz wrote that "Vinoo Anand, the debutant director, has done a good job with his first attempt in Malluwood. The movie, though not a typical entertainer, will definitely hold you in the seats till the end".

References

External links

2006 films
2000s Malayalam-language films
Films scored by Ouseppachan